Acharya Harihar Post Graduate Institute of Cancer, Cuttack, also known as Acharya Harihar Regional Cancer Centre, Cuttack, is a cancer care hospital and research institute. It is located in Cuttack, Odisha, India. It is named after social worker Acharya Harihara, a disciple of Acharya Vinoba Bhabe, founder of the Bhudan movement.

History
Acharya Harihar Post Graduate Institute of Cancer, Cuttack was started as a full-fledged Radiotherapy department of SCB Medical College, Cuttack with 100 beds. Later, in 1984, it was promoted as an autonomous institution and was named Acharya Harihar Regional Cancer Centre, Cuttack.

Courses
It offers postgraduate degree courses in Anaesthesiology, Gynaecological Oncology, and Surgical Oncology.

References

Medical colleges in Odisha
Universities and colleges in Odisha
Educational institutions established in 1962
1962 establishments in Orissa